Pulmonary rehabilitation, also known as respiratory rehabilitation, is an important part of the management and health maintenance of people with chronic respiratory disease who remain symptomatic or continue to have decreased function despite standard medical treatment. It is a broad therapeutic concept. It is defined by the American Thoracic Society and the European Respiratory Society as an evidence-based, multidisciplinary, and comprehensive intervention for patients with chronic respiratory diseases who are symptomatic and often have decreased daily life activities.  In general, pulmonary rehabilitation refers to a series of services that are administered to patients of respiratory disease and their families, typically to attempt to improve the quality of life for the patient. Pulmonary rehabilitation may be carried out in a variety of settings, depending on the patient's needs, and may or may not include pharmacologic intervention.

Medical uses 
The NICE clinical guideline on chronic obstructive pulmonary disease states that “pulmonary rehabilitation should be offered to all patients who consider themselves functionally disabled by COPD (usually MRC [Medical Research Council] grade 3 and above)”. It is indicated not only in patients with COPD, but also for the following conditions:
 Cystic fibrosis
 Bronchitis
 Sarcoidosis
 Idiopathic pulmonary fibrosis
 Before and after lung surgery
 Interstitial lung disease: Pulmonary rehabilitation may be safe and may help improve functional exercise capacity, a person's short-term quality of life, and improve shortness of breath (dyspnoea).

Aim 
 To reduce symptoms
 To improve knowledge of lung condition and promote self-management
 To increase muscle strength and endurance (peripheral and respiratory)
 To increase exercise tolerance
 To reduce length of hospital stay
 To help to function better in day-to-day life 
 To help in managing anxiety and depression

Benefits 
 Reduction in number of days spent in hospital one year following pulmonary rehabilitation.
 Reduction in the number of exacerbations in patients who performed daily exercise when compared to those who did not exercise.
 Reduced exacerbations post pulmonary rehabilitation.

Weaknesses addressed 
 Ventilatory limitation
Increased dead space ventilation
Impaired gas exchange
Increased ventilatory demands due to peripheral muscle dysfunction
 Gas exchange limitation
Compromised functional inspiratory muscle strength
Compromised inspiratory muscle endurance 
 Cardiac dysfunction
Increase in right ventricular afterload due to increased peripheral vascular resistance.
 Skeletal muscle dysfunction
Average reduction in quadriceps strength  decreased by 20-30% in moderate to severe COPD 
Reduction in the proportion of type I muscle fibres and an increase in the proportion of type II fibres compared to age matched normal subjects
Reduction in capillary to fibre ratio and peak oxygen consumption
Reduction in oxidative enzyme capacity and increased blood lactate levels at lower work rates compared to normal subjects 
Prolonged periods of under nutrition which results in a reduction in strength and endurance 
 Respiratory muscle dysfunction

Background 

Pulmonary rehabilitation is generally specific to the individual patient, with the objective of meeting the needs of the patient. It is a broad program and may benefit patients with lung diseases such as chronic obstructive pulmonary disease (COPD), sarcoidosis, idiopathic pulmonary fibrosis (IPF) and cystic fibrosis, among others. Although the process is focused primarily on the rehabilitation of the patient, the family is also involved. The process typically does not begin until a medical examination of the patient has been performed by a licensed physician.

The setting of pulmonary rehabilitation varies by patient; settings may include inpatient care, outpatient care, the office of a physician, or the patient's home.

Although there are no universally accepted procedure codes for pulmonary rehabilitation, providers usually use codes for general therapeutic processes.

The goal of pulmonary rehabilitation is to help improve the well-being and quality of life of the patient and their families. Accordingly, programs typically focus on several aspects of the patient's recovery and can include medication management, exercise training, breathing retraining, education about the patient's lung disease and how to manage it, nutrition counseling, and emotional support.

Pharmacologic intervention 

Medications may be used in the process of pulmonary rehabilitation including: anti-inflammatory agents (inhaled steroids), bronchodilators, long-acting bronchodilators, beta-2 agonists, anticholinergic agents, oral steroids, antibiotics, mucolytic agents, oxygen therapy, or preventive healthcare (i.e., vaccination).

Exercise 
Exercise is the cornerstone of pulmonary rehabilitation programs. Although exercise training does not directly improve lung function, it causes several physiological adaptations to exercise that can improve physical condition. There are three basic types of exercises to be considered. Aerobic exercise tends to improve the body's ability to use oxygen by decreasing heart rate and blood pressure. Strengthening or resistance exercises can help build strength in the respiratory muscles. Stretching and flexibility exercises like yoga and Pilates can enhance breathing coordination. As exercise can trigger shortness of breath, it is important to build up the level of exercise gradually under the supervision of health care professionals (e.g., respiratory therapist, physiotherapist, exercise physiologist). Additionally, pursed lip breathing can be used to increase oxygen level in the patient's body. Breathing games can be used to motivate patients to learn the pursed lip breathing technique.

Guidelines 
Clinical practice guidelines have been issued by various regulatory authorities.
 American College of Chest Physicians (ACCP) and the American Association of Cardiovascular and Pulmonary Rehabilitation has provided evidence-based guidelines in 1997 and has updated it.
 British Thoracic Society Standards of Care (BTS) Subcommittee on Pulmonary Rehabilitation has published its guidelines in 2001.
 Canadian Thoracic Society (CTS) 2010 Guideline: Optimizing pulmonary rehabilitation in chronic obstructive pulmonary disease.
 National Institute for Health and Care Excellence (NICE) Guidelines

Contraindications 
The exclusion criteria for pulmonary rehabilitation consists of the following:
 Unstable cardiovascular disease
 Orthopaedic contraindications
 Neurological contraindication
 Unstable pulmonary disease

Outcome 
The clinical improvement in outcomes due to pulmonary rehabilitation is measurable through:
 Exercise testing using exercise time
 Walk test using the 6-minute walk test
 Exertion and overall dyspnoea using the Borg scale
 Respiratory specific functional status has been shown to improve using the CAT Score

References 

Medical treatments
Respiratory therapy